Bente Landheim (born 1990) is a Norwegian biathlete.

She competed at the Biathlon World Championships 2012, and won bronze medal in the relay at the Biathlon European Championships 2014, and in mixed relay at the 2016 IBU Open European Championships.

References

External links
 

1990 births
Living people
Norwegian female biathletes
21st-century Norwegian women